Aristolochia tricaudata is a species of perennial plant in the family Aristolochiaceae. It is found in Chiapas and Oaxaca, Mexico.

References

External links

tricaudata